Calliopsis pugionis is a species of mining bee in the family Andrenidae. It is found in North America.

References

Further reading

 
 
 

Andrenidae
Insects described in 1925